The 1921 Cleveland Indians season was their second in the National Football League. The team improved on their previous record of 2–4–2, winning three games. They finished eleventh in the league.

Schedule

 Game in italics is against a non-NFL team.

Standings

References

Cleveland Indians (NFL) seasons
Cleveland Indians
Cleveland Indians (NFL)